CpG-binding protein (CGBP) also known as CXXC-type zinc finger protein 1 (CXXC1) or PHD finger and CXXC domain-containing protein 1 (PCCX1) is a protein that in humans is encoded by the CXXC1 gene.

Proteins that contain a CXXC motif within their DNA-binding domain, such as CXXC1, recognize CpG sequences and regulate gene expression.

References

External links

Further reading